My Daughter, Your Daughter (German: Meine Tochter – Deine Tochter) is a 1972 West German comedy film directed by Werner Jacobs and starring Chris Roberts, Georg Thomalla and Peter Weck.  Location shooting took place in Carinthia, particularly around the Wörthersee.

A teacher at a German school is persuaded to impersonate the father of the caretaker's daughter visiting from America, leading to a series of complications.

Cast
 Chris Roberts as Rick Roland
 Georg Thomalla as Studienrat Dr. Oskar Sommer
 Peter Weck as Studienrat Staub
 Catharina Conti as Lisbeth Sommer
 Hans Kraus as Edi Rausch
 Ralf Wolter as Bibo
 Silvia Reize as Betty Snell
 Gretl Schörg as Schuldirektorin Regina Körner
 Heinrich Schweiger as Polizeihauptmann Rausch
 Rainer Basedow as Rolf
 Kurt Nachmann as Schulrat Weber
 Erich Kleiber as Bassist
 Gila von Weitershausen as Hella Mattes
 Heinz Reincke as Schuldiener Oskar Sommer

References

Bibliography
 Bock, Hans-Michael & Bergfelder, Tim. The Concise CineGraph. Encyclopedia of German Cinema. Berghahn Books, 2009.

External links

1972 films
1972 comedy films
German comedy films
West German films
1970s German-language films
Films directed by Werner Jacobs
Gloria Film films
1970s German films